Ducceschi is an Italian surname. Notable people with the surname include:

Manrico Ducceschi (1920–1948), Italian partisan
Raffaello Ducceschi (born 1962), Italian designer and race walker

Italian-language surnames